Skullflower is a British noise rock band, formed in 1987 in London, England. Led by guitarist Matthew Bower, the band attained a cult following with a sound based on "sludgy, Black Sabbath-style riffs overlaid with feedback, fuzzed-out guitar noise, and throttling rhythms, all played at a high volume." Always an improvisational outfit, the band's music grew increasingly free-form over the course of their career, moving farther away from the rock music form.

The band's lineup has been fluid; the early core members were Bower, drummer/vocalist Stuart Dennison and bassist/guitarist Stefan Jaworzyn. Other contributors included guitarist Gary Mundy of Ramleh, bassist Alex Binnie, bassist/drummer Stephen Thrower of Coil, and auxiliary bassist/guitarist/drummer Anthony DiFranco.

References

Musical groups established in 1987
English noise rock groups
Tumult Records artists